Edme-François-Étienne Gois, also Étienne Gois le fils, (1765–1836) was a French sculptor.

Born in Paris, Gois was the son of the sculptor Étienne-Pierre-Adrien Gois, with whom he initially trained. He then attended the École des Beaux-Arts, where he won the second prize in sculpture in 1788 and a first prize in 1791. The 1791 work was a depiction of Abimelech Taking Sarah. The first prize was originally awarded to Pierre-Charles Bridan. Gois wrote to the king for another first prize, which was granted. Louis XVI of France hastened to write to the Academy for this award to be presented, and it was immediately given to the Gois.

References
 Ferdinand Hoefer, New General Biography, vol. 21, Paris, Firmin-Didot, 1858, p. 86-7.

1765 births
1836 deaths
18th-century French sculptors
French male sculptors
19th-century French sculptors
Artists from Paris
19th-century French male artists
18th-century French male artists